Caminemos (English title: Let's walk) is a Mexican telenovela produced by Irene Sabido for Televisa in 1980.

Cast 
Irma Lozano as Eudelia/Evelia
Enrique Lizalde as Ricardo
Marga López as Aurora
Norma Lazareno as Adelina
Jaime Garza as Julio
Ana Silvia Garza as Gloria
Carmen Delgado as Pily
Lorena Rivero as Elsa
Alejandro Guce as Arturo
Andres Ruiz Sandoval as Uriel
Natasha Pueblita as Miriam (daughter)
Adriana Roel as Miriam
Sonia Martinez as Tere
Margot Wagner as Martha
Hector Cruz as Victor
Alvaro Zermeño as Ernesto

References

External links 

Mexican telenovelas
1980 telenovelas
Televisa telenovelas
Spanish-language telenovelas
1980 Mexican television series debuts
1980 Mexican television series endings